2008 Continental Championships may refer to:

African Championships
 Athletics: 2008 African Championships in Athletics

Asian Championships
 Football (soccer): 2008 AFC Women's Asian Cup
 Football (soccer): 2008 AFC Champions League 
 Multisport: 2008 Asian Beach Games
 Weightlifting: 2008 Asian Weightlifting Championships

European Championships

 Figure skating: 2008 European Figure Skating Championships
 Football (soccer): 2007–08 UEFA Champions League
 Football (soccer): 2007–08 UEFA Cup
 Football (soccer): UEFA Euro 2008
 Football (soccer): 2008 UEFA European Under-17 Championship
 Football (soccer): 2007–08 UEFA Women's Cup
 2008 European Rowing Championships
 Volleyball: 2007–08 CEV Champions League
 Volleyball: 2007–08 CEV Women's Champions League 
 2008 European Karate Championships

Oceanian Championships
 Football (soccer): 2007–08 OFC Champions League
 Swimming: 2008 Oceania Swimming Championships

Pan American Championships / North American Championships
 Football (soccer): 2008 Caribbean Cup 
 Football (soccer): 2008 CONCACAF Champions' Cup
 Gymnastics (artistic): 2008 Pan American Individual Event Artistic Gymnastics Championships
 Gymnastics (trampoline and tumbling): 2008 Pan American Trampoline and Tumbling Championships

South American Championships
 Football (soccer): 2008 Copa Libertadores
 Football (soccer): 2008 Copa Sudamericana
 Football (soccer): 2008 Recopa Sudamericana

See also
 2008 World Championships (disambiguation)
 2008 World Junior Championships (disambiguation)
 2008 World Cup (disambiguation)
 Continental championship (disambiguation)

Continental championships